Wannu, or Abinsi after the district in which it is spoken, is a Jukunoid language of Nigeria. It belongs to the Jukun Wapan (Kororofa) language cluster.

References

Jukunoid languages
Languages of Nigeria